Liu Mingkang (born August 28, 1946 in Fuzhou, Fujian) is a former Chinese politician, public servant and economist from China.  He graduated from the University of London in 1987. In 1988 he received an MBA from the Cass Business School. He served as chairman of the China Banking Regulatory Commission from its creation in 2003 until he reached the retirement age of 65. During his tenure he was responsible for putting in place an effective regulatory structure which helped the Chinese banking system weather the global financial crisis and emerge relatively healthy and well capitalized.

Liu told the Boao Forum for Asia in 2012 that liberalization of financial markets is "part of a package" in the latest Five-Year Plan for promoting domestic-driven growth and rebalancing exports and imports. The liberalization "is not a piecemeal approach, but part of a series of building blocks, he said", according to one report.

Early life 
Liu grew up in Shanghai after completing high school in 1965. He was sent to do manual labour at a farm in Kiangsu province where he taught himself English studying old BBC textbooks and listening to VOA. In 1979, at age 29 he passed the civil service exam. 

Liu was influenced by  Margaret Thatcher's privatisation in 1984 while  serving at the Bank of China's branch in London. He subsequently earned an MBA from City University of London.

Career highlights 

2011–present     BCT Distinguished Research Fellow of the Institute of Global Economics and Finance, The Chinese University of Hong Kong
Current, the first distinguished fellow of the Fung Global Institute, Hong Kong
2007— Member, 17th CPC, Central Committee
Current member, China National Energy Commission
Current Vice Chairman of the Committee for Economic Affairs of the National Committee of the Chinese People's Political Consultative Conference
2003—2011 Chairman, China Banking Regulatory Commission
2002—2007 Alternate Member, 16th CPC, Central Committee
2000—2003 Chairman of Bank of China
1999–2000 Chairman of China Everbright Group
1998—1999 Deputy Governor, People's Bank of China, vice-chairman of Monetary Policy Department
1994–1998 Deputy Governor China Development Bank
1993–1994 Deputy Governor and Secretary-General of 
1988–1993 Deputy Governor (later Governor) of Bank of China Fujian Province branch

References

Additional References
Liu Mingkang - China Banking Regulatory Commission
China Vitae : Biography of Liu Mingkang
Liu Mingkang cv

1946 births
Living people
Alumni of the University of London
Alumni of Bayes Business School
People's Republic of China politicians from Fujian
Political office-holders in Fujian
Chinese Communist Party politicians from Fujian
Politicians from Fuzhou
China Everbright Group people
Chinese bankers
Officials of the People's Bank of China
China Development Bank people